÷

Virtual Fly Brain, or VFB, is an interactive, web-based tool that allows neurobiologists to explore the detailed neuroanatomy, transgene expression and associated phenotypes of the Drosophila melanogaster brain. Users can browse painted 3D image stacks of the Drosophila brain, choosing any plane of section they want and clicking on painted regions to find names' definitions, references and synonyms for the chosen region.  For each region, they can run queries to find neurons, transgene expression and phenotypes.  For each neuron found, users can browse definitions, references and synonyms.

Background
Virtual Fly Brain is a generic web-based application that allows browsing of 3D image stacks and querying of the underlying anatomy and expression database that is maintained by FlyBase. The Virtual Fly Brain project is carried out by researchers at the University of Cambridge and the University of Edinburgh.

Technical details
Virtual Fly Brain uses an ontological model of Drosophila anatomy written in OWL2 and based on the Drosophila literature. This contains detailed information about both gross neuroanatomy, neuron classes and the relationships between them. Underlying each neuroanatomy query is a query of this ontology in OWL-DL.

Queries of phenotype and expression utilise the large volume of expression and phenotype data in FlyBase annotated using the Drosophila anatomy ontology. Each expression or phenotype query starts with a query of the anatomy ontology for terms appropriate to the chosen region. The output of this query is then used as input for a query of the FlyBase chado database for expression or phenotype annotated using these terms.

Images in the viewer are delivered as a series of tiles covering only the visible area in the browser window. The tiles are produced from a compound 3D Woolz object representing the overall structure and individual painted domains.

See also
Insect brain
Drosophila connectome
Ganglion mother cell
Pigment dispersing factor

References

External links 
 virtualflybrain.org
 FlyBase

Neuroanatomy
Drosophila melanogaster
Invertebrate nervous system